The paradox of hedonism, also called the pleasure paradox, refers to the practical difficulties encountered in the pursuit of pleasure. For the hedonist, constant pleasure-seeking may not yield the most actual pleasure or happiness in the long term—or short term, when consciously pursuing pleasure interferes with experiencing it.

The utilitarian philosopher Henry Sidgwick was first to note in The Methods of Ethics that the paradox of hedonism is that pleasure cannot be acquired directly. Variations on this theme appear in the realms of philosophy, psychology, and economics.

Overview

It is often said that we fail to attain pleasures if we deliberately seek them. This has been described variously, by many:

 John Stuart Mill, the utilitarian philosopher, in his autobiography:
But I now thought that this end [one's happiness] was only to be attained by not making it the direct end. Those only are happy (I thought) who have their minds fixed on some object other than their own happiness[....] Aiming thus  at something else, they find happiness along the way[....] Ask yourself whether you are happy, and you cease to be so.

 Viktor Frankl in Man's Search for Meaning:
Happiness cannot be pursued; it must ensue, and it only does so as the unintended side effect of one's personal dedication to a cause greater than oneself or as the by-product of one's surrender to a person other than oneself.

The more a man tries to demonstrate his sexual potency or a woman her ability to experience orgasm, the less they are able to succeed. Pleasure is, and must remain, a side-effect or by-product, and is destroyed and spoiled to the degree to which it is made a goal in itself.

 Philosopher Friedrich Nietzsche in The Antichrist (1895) and The Will to Power (1901):
What is good? Everything that heightens the feeling of power in man, the will to power, power itself.
What is bad?  Everything that is born of weakness.
What is happiness?  The feeling that power increases—that a resistance is overcome.

[...] it is significantly enlightening to substitute for the individual 'happiness' (for which every living being is supposed to strive) power [...] joy is only a symptom of the feeling of attained power [...] (one does not strive for joy [...] joy accompanies; joy does not move)

 Psychologist Alfred Adler in The Neurotic Constitution (1912):
Nietzsche's "will to power" and "will to seem" embrace many of our views, which again resemble in some respects the views of Féré and the older writers, according to whom the sensation of pleasure originates in a feeling of power, that of pain in a feeling of feebleness.

 Poet and satirist Edward Young:
The love of praise, howe'er concealed by art,
Reigns more or less supreme in every heart;
The Proud to gain it, toils on toils endure;
The modest shun it, but to make it sure!

 Politician William Bennett:
Happiness is like a cat, if you try to coax it or call it, it will avoid you; it will never come. But if you pay no attention to it and go about your business, you'll find it rubbing against your legs and jumping into your lap.

 Novelist João Guimarães Rosa:
Happiness is found only in little moments of inattention.

Suggested explanations
Happiness is often imprecisely equated with pleasure. If, for whatever reason, one does equate happiness with pleasure, then the paradox of hedonism arises. When one aims solely towards pleasure itself, one's aim is frustrated. Henry Sidgwick comments on such frustration after a discussion of self-love in the above-mentioned work:

I should not, however, infer from this that the pursuit of pleasure is necessarily self-defeating and futile; but merely that the principle of Egoistic Hedonism, when applied with a due knowledge of the laws of human nature, is practically self-limiting; i.e., that a rational method of attaining the end at which it aims requires that we should to some extent put it out of sight and not directly aim at it.

While not addressing the paradox directly, Aristotle commented on the futility of pursuing pleasure. Human beings are actors whose endeavours bring about consequences, and among these is pleasure. Aristotle then argues as follows:

How, then, is it that no one is continuously pleased? Is it that we grow weary? Certainly all human things are incapable of continuous activity. Therefore pleasure also is not continuous; for it accompanies activity.

Sooner or later, finite beings will be unable to acquire and expend the resources necessary to maintain their sole goal of pleasure; thus, they find themselves in the company of misery. Evolutionary theory explains that humans evolved through natural selection and follow genetic imperatives that seek to maximize reproduction, not happiness. As a result of these selection pressures, the extent of human happiness is limited biologically. David Pearce argues in his treatise The Hedonistic Imperative that humans might be able to use genetic engineering, nanotechnology, and neuroscience to eliminate suffering in all human life and allow for peak levels of happiness and pleasure that are currently unimaginable.

See also

 Altruism
 Easterlin paradox
 False pleasure
 Hedonic treadmill
 Intrinsic value
 Leisure satisfaction
 Psychological egoism
 Willpower paradox

References

Further reading 
 Aristotle, Nicomachean Ethics 1175, 3–6 in The Basic Works of Aristotle, Richard McKeon ed. (New York: Random House, 1941)
 John Stuart Mill, Autobiography in The Harvard Classics, Vol. 25, Charles Eliot Norton, ed. (New York: P. F. Collier  & Son Company, 1909)
 Henry  Sidgwick,  The  Methods of  Ethics (London: Macmillan  & Co.  Ltd., 1874/1963)

External links 
 Konow, James, & Joseph Earley. "The Hedonistic Paradox: Is homo economicus happier?" Journal of Public Economics 92, 2008.

Hedonism
Utilitarianism
Philosophical paradoxes